Paul Lynch (born 1938 in Enniscorthy, County Wexford) was an Irish sportsperson.  He played hurling with his local club Enniscorthy Shamrocks and was a member of the Wexford senior inter-county team from 1962 until 1969.

References

1938 births
2014 deaths
Enniscorthy Shamrocks hurlers
Wexford inter-county hurlers
All-Ireland Senior Hurling Championship winners